Robert Topham (3 November 1867 – 31 August 1931) was an English international footballer, who played as an outside right.

Career
Born in Ellesmere, Topham played for Wolverhampton Wanderers, Corinthian and Casuals, and earned two caps for England between 1893 and 1894.

He was part of the Corinthian side that competed in the 1898 Sheriff of London Charity Shield against league winners Sheffield United, winning the free kick that Wilfrid Foster scored in the 1-1 replay which resulted in the honour being shared.

His brother Arthur was also a footballer.

References

External links

1867 births
1931 deaths
English footballers
England international footballers
Wolverhampton Wanderers F.C. players
Casuals F.C. players
Corinthian F.C. players
People from Ellesmere, Shropshire
Association football outside forwards
FA Cup Final players